Gangapur may refer to:

India

 Gangapur, Bihar, a village in Buxar district
 Gangapur, Karnataka, Gadag District
 Gangapur, Maharashtra
 Gangapur, Odisha, Surada, Ganjam district
 Gangapur, Rajasthan (disambiguation)
 Gangapur, Sawai Madhopur, or Gangapur City
 Gangapur City railway station
 Gangapur, Bhilwara
 Gangapur, Varanasi, Uttar Pradesh
Gangapur, North 24 Parganas, West Bengal

Elsewhere
 Gangapur, Nepal
 Ghangha Pur, Punjab, Pakistan